Mano Sakrim is a chiefdom in Pujehun District of Sierra Leone with a population of 7,536. Its principal town is Gbonjema.

References

Chiefdoms of Sierra Leone
Southern Province, Sierra Leone